Eli Cohen (born 29 May 1949) is an Israeli politician who served as a member of the Knesset for Likud between 2002 and 2003. He was Israel's ambassador to Japan from 2004 until 2007.

Biography
Eli Cohen was born in Jerusalem to a family who immigrated from Tunisia to Israel. He studied mathematics and physics at the Hebrew University of Jerusalem, gaining a BA and his MBA degree from the University of West London. He served as a Betar emissary to North America and director of the Settlement Department of the World Zionist Organization.

Political and diplomatic career
A former deputy head of the Ma'ale Adumim council, he was placed 23rd on the Likud list for the 1999 elections, but missed out on a seat as the party won only 19 seats. However, he entered the Knesset on 22 February 2002 as a replacement for Joshua Matza. He lost his seat in the 2003 elections. 

Cohen served as ambassador to Japan from 2004 to 2007.He is the author of several books in Japanese about Israeli and Japanese culture and about Bushido lifestyle in contemporary Japan.

Martial arts career
Cohen is a 5th degree black belt in karate.  He served as president of the Israel Shotokan karate organization and coached martial arts at Wingate Institute.

Business career
Cohen is president of EC Advanced Technologies Marketing, which he founded in 1999. He also serves as a consultant for Israeli and Japanese high-tech and real estate companies.

Awards and recognition
 Order of the Rising Sun, 2nd Class, Gold and Silver Star (2018)/

References

External links

1949 births
Living people
Likud politicians
Ambassadors of Israel to Japan
Israeli male karateka
Hebrew University of Jerusalem alumni
Alumni of the University of West London
Israeli people of Tunisian-Jewish descent
People from Jerusalem
Academic staff of Wingate Institute
Members of the 15th Knesset (1999–2003)
Recipients of the Order of the Rising Sun, 2nd class